NAME ASADULLAH.                                  PRESENTATION TOPIC- DAVID MILLER      PROF. NAME. SIR RANA RASHID SAAB.    ￼                                                                                         David Leslie Miller  (born 8 March 1946) is an English political theorist. He is Professor of Political Theory at the University of Oxford and an Official Fellow of Nuffield College, Oxford. He previously lectured at the University of Lancaster and the University of East Anglia. He received his Bachelor of Arts degree from the University of Cambridge, and his Bachelor of Philosophy and Doctor of Philosophy degrees from the University of Oxford. Previous works include Social Justice, On Nationality and Citizenship and National Identity. Miller is known for his support of a modest form of liberal nationalism.

Contribution
In Principles of Social Justice Miller proposes a pluralist account of social justice, arguing that there can be no single measure of justice. This puts him in opposition to theorists such as Robert Nozick or John Rawls, who both argue for some sort of 'unifying theory' in understandings of justice.

He claims that 'social justice' (defined as the 'just' distribution of benefits and burdens within society) can only be defined in reference to our 'considered judgements'. That is, philosophy must come from lived experience and empirical evidence. This is what leads him to argue for multiple sources of justice as in his opinion people believe in a range of rationales for justice.

Miller states that the most 'just' distribution depends on the type of relationship between the people involved. In 'solidaristic communities,' where people identify themselves as holding a shared culture or belief, distributions should be made in accordance with need (e.g. family or church group). In 'instrumental associations', where people are acting together with a common purpose but each for their own good (and not necessarily sharing a common identity or 'conception of the good'), justice is best served by allocating by desert (e.g. in the workplace). Contributions should be recognised with proportionate rewards. In 'citizenship', where people are related through political and legal structures, equality should prevail (e.g. in countries). His definition of equality involves equal status for members by the allocation of equal civil, political and social rights. Equal social rights entails the equal ability to make use of the political and civil rights, and therefore demands a welfare state and some redistribution of wealth.

In On Nationality and Citizenship and National Identity Miller defends a moderate, liberal form of nationalism, which he views as an important factor in maintaining support for welfare states (including institutions such as the British National Health Service). The nation state, he argues, performs the role of replicating the social solidarity found in local communities at the level of states in which populations are largely anonymous. He argues that we have greater ethical duties to our co-nationals than nationals of other states: "nations are ethical communities ... The duties we owe to our fellow-nationals are different from, and more extensive than, the duties we owe to humans as such".

Criticisms
Miller's work has been subject to numerous criticisms and replies, for instance a special issue of the journal Critical Review of International Social and Political Philosophy on 'Nationalism and Global Justice – David Miller and His Critics' (Vol. 11, no. 4).

Miller's arguments lead to tricky situations if more than one relationship could be said to exist (for example, two family members who also work together). He does not give any 'lexical ordering' to his proposals, but does work through a wide range of scenarios arguing that in each situation, a 'just' understanding of the relationship can trump and maintain a wider social justice.

In the context of citizenship and state organisation, his proposal of civil, political and social equality leads to a strong redistributive state with a 'universal' welfare system.

Critiques of Miller point out that he leaves the details, and the situations where it is most important to hold some notion of social justice to be able to argue the case, too vague. It is not good enough to say 'it depends' if one is trying to argue a philosophical case.

Other critics of Miller take issue with his view that principles of justice must connect in some way with the current beliefs of individuals, arguing that this biases political theory towards the status quo, rendering it overly conservative. 

Collecting evidence on people's deep held but rarely scrutinised beliefs about justice is notoriously difficult and unreliable. His argument for multiple rationales for justice comes in part from his belief in cultural pluralism (there are no universally shared beliefs) but theorists such as Franz Oppenheimer dispute this.

A feminist perspective might criticise his separation of spheres of justice. For people who are not engaged in one sphere, they can never receive their 'just' distribution in reference to their needs or deserts. For example, a person with no family or close friends may not belong to any 'solidaristic community' willing to distribute to compensate for their 'needs' beyond those which their position as a citizen will confer. A person who has never and will never work (home-makers, severely disabled people) will never receive 'dues' for the labour or activity which they do engage with.

In practical terms, he comes under fire for defending desert as a principle of social justice. A deterministic view of the world leads to the conclusion that we are not responsible for our skills, talents or abilities (including our ability to work to improve any natural talents) therefore it is unjust to be rewarded for them. Of course, if determinism is rejected, then the idea of morally valued "merit" can have intellectual "merit".  Many argue that meritocracy is a fundamental principle of the United States and to reject this idea is to vitiate our society of one of its core values.  Rawls merely asserts his position on merit.  The opposite position can also be, just as legitimately and with as much intellectual support, asserted.  Miller proposes that desert can be allocated through a strictly controlled market (to limit too much inequality). But others say that the objects or talents that the 'market' (that is, society) put economic value upon is not a just way to determine what is deserving.

Miller's support for liberal forms of nationalism has been criticised by theorists such as Iris Marion Young, who stresses the need to develop forms of solidarity that extend beyond the state. It can be argued that Miller's assertion that we have greater ethical obligations to our co-nationals than to nationals of other states relies on an assumption that all states are equally well placed to provide for their citizens' needs, and defend their rights. Critics point out that this does not correspond to empirical reality. Young gives the example of natural resources, which are unequally distributed between states. She argues that their placement is morally arbitrary.

Selected publications
Social Justice, 1976
Philosophy and Ideology in Hume's Political Thought, 1981
Anarchism, 1984, 
Market, State, and Community: Theoretical Foundations of Market Socialism, 1989
On Nationality, Oxford, 1995
Principles of Social Justice, Harvard, 1999
Citizenship and National Identity, Polity, 2000
Political Philosophy: A Very Short Introduction, Oxford, 2003
National Responsibility and Global Justice, Oxford, 2007
Justice for Earthlings: Essays in Political Philosophy, Oxford, 2013
Strangers in Our Midst: The Political Philosophy of Immigration, Harvard, 2016

References

1946 births
Academics of Lancaster University
Academics of the University of East Anglia
Alumni of Selwyn College, Cambridge
English political philosophers
English political scientists
English socialists
Fellows of Nuffield College, Oxford
Living people
Market socialism
Scholars of nationalism